"Wasted Time" is the third single taken from the Youth and Young Manhood album by the American rock band Kings of Leon. The song reached number 51 on the UK Singles Chart. The version from the Holy Roller Novocaine EP was featured on 
"The Boys Are Back in Town", the first episode of the second season of Entourage.

Track listing

CD single
"Wasted Time"
"Molly's Hangover"
"Joe's Head" (Live in LA)
"Wasted Time" (Video)

10" vinyl
Released on silver-coloured vinyl.

"Wasted Time" - 2:46
"Molly's Hangover" - 4:23

External links
 10" vinyl information – Discogs.com reference page.

Kings of Leon songs
2003 singles
Music videos directed by Mark Pellington
2003 songs
Songs written by Nathan Followill
Songs written by Caleb Followill
Songs written by Angelo Petraglia